Behind The Mask is a 1946 American comedy-mystery film directed by Phil Karlson and starring Kane Richmond and Barbara Read. It was the second in a series of three  films released by Monogram in 1946 starring Richmond as the crimefighter The Shadow, the others being The Shadow Returns and The Missing Lady.

Synopsis
Lamont Cranston, alias The Shadow, has to clear his name of the murder of a blackmailing newspaper reporter by solving the crime himself.

Cast 
 Kane Richmond as Lamont Cranston (The Shadow)
 Barbara Read as Margo Lane
 George Chandler as Shrevvie
 Dorothea Kent as Jennie Delaney
 Joseph Crehan as Police Inspector Cardonna
 Pierre Watkin as Police Commissioner Weston
 Robert Shayne as Brad Thomas
 June Clyde as Edith Merrill
 James Cardwell as Jeff Marin
 Marjorie Hoshelle as Mae Bishop
 Joyce Compton as Lulu

Reception

Film historian Larry Langman dismissed Behind the Mask as a "feeble entry in the Shadow mystery series". Critic Leonard Maltin gave the film a mixed review, describing it as a "decent low-budget whodunit" with "some nice visual touches but way too much 'comedy' relief."

References

External links 
 
 
 

1940s comedy mystery films
American comedy mystery films
Monogram Pictures films
The Shadow films
1946 films
Films directed by Phil Karlson
American black-and-white films
1946 comedy films
1940s English-language films
1940s American films